Highland station is an MBTA Commuter Rail station in Boston, Massachusetts. It serves the Needham Line. It is located in the Bellevue Hill section of West Roxbury. The station has a mini-high platform for accessibility.

The station originally opened around 1855 on the Boston and Providence Railroad's West Roxbury Branch. A stone station building, similar to one constructed at Mount Hope station the previous year, was built in 1885.

The MBTA expanded the parking lot in the early 1990s.

References

External links

MBTA - Highland
Station from Google Maps Street View

MBTA Commuter Rail stations in Boston
Former New York, New Haven and Hartford Railroad stations
Railway stations in the United States opened in 1855